Michael James Kuiti (born 18 March 1963 in Foxton, New Zealand) is a New Zealand rugby league player who played professionally in England and represented New Zealand, including in test matches that counted towards the 1992 World Cup. Currently living in Lower Hutt, New Zealand.

Playing career
Kuiti was a member of the Upper Hutt club in the Wellington Rugby League competition, making his senior début in 1980. He was part of premiership wins in 1986 and 1987. Kuiti played for the club until 1992, becoming club captain.

On 8 January 1990 Kuiti signed with  the Leeds club. He spent three seasons at the club before joining Rochdale Hornets. Mike Kuiti played, and scored a try in Rochdale Hornets 14-24 defeat by St. Helens in the 1991 Lancashire County Cup Final during the 1991–92 season at Wilderspool Stadium, Warrington, on Sunday 20 October 1991. Kuiti then spent three years at Oldham (Heritage № 1012) before joining Wakefield Trinity (captain) (Heritage № 1075) in 1996. Kuiti also played for the Batley Bulldogs and Swinton Lions.

Representative career
Kuiti represented Wellington, making his début in 1981. Kuiti went on to play in 59 games for Wellington and is the sixth highest capped player. He played for Central Districts four times between 1984 and 1987 and also played for New Zealand Māori, including at the 1986 Pacific Cup.

Kuiti made his long-awaited New Zealand national rugby league team début on the 1989 tour of Great Britain and France. He played in eleven games on tour, including two test wins over France. He was dropped in 1990 for home tests against Great Britain before being reinstated for the 1990 tour of Papua New Guinea. He finished his international career with two tests against the touring Great Britain Lions in 1992.

Coaching career
Kuiti was the head coach of the Porirua Pumas in the 2000 Bartercard Cup.

In 2010 Kuiti was the coach of the Hutt International Boys' School side in the Wellington Rugby League's Stephen Kearney Cup.

He coached the Wellington Orcas in the 2013 National Competition.

Legacy
In 2012 he was named in the Wellington Rugby League's Team of the Century.

References

External links
(archived by web.archive.org) Statistics at orl-heritagetrust.org.uk

1963 births
Living people
Batley Bulldogs coaches
Batley Bulldogs players
Central Districts rugby league team players
Leeds Rhinos players
New Zealand Māori rugby league players
New Zealand Māori rugby league team players
New Zealand national rugby league team players
New Zealand rugby league coaches
New Zealand rugby league players
Oldham R.L.F.C. players
People from Foxton, New Zealand
New Zealand expatriate sportspeople in England
Rochdale Hornets players
Rugby league locks
Rugby league second-rows
Upper Hutt Tigers captains
Upper Hutt Tigers players
Wakefield Trinity captains
Wakefield Trinity players
Wellington rugby league team coaches
Wellington rugby league team players